Future World No.1 Iga Świątek defeated Leonie Küng in the final, 6–4, 6–2. It was Świątek's first title on grass.

Claire Liu was the defending champion, but chose to compete in the ladies' singles as a qualifier; she lost to eventual champion Angelique Kerber in the second round.

This tournament featured a second round match between Emma Raducanu and Leylah Fernandez; the pair would later face off in the women's final of the 2021 US Open. Raducanu won this encounter before losing to Świątek in the quarterfinals.

Seeds

Draw

Finals

Top half

Section 1

Section 2

Bottom half

Section 3

Section 4

Qualifying

Seeds

Qualifiers

Lucky loser

Draw

First qualifier

Second qualifier

Third qualifier

Fourth qualifier

Fifth qualifier

Sixth qualifier

Seventh qualifier

Eighth qualifier

References

External links
 Draw

Girls' Singles
Wimbledon Championship by year – Girls' singles